Longdong University is a college in Qingyang, a Chinese city in eastern Gansu.

References

Universities and colleges in Gansu